Articles related to East Germany include:

A
Konrad Adenauer - 
Administrative divisions of East Germany -  
Aktuelle Kamera - 
Alexanderplatz - 
Alexanderplatz demonstration - 
Alliance 90 - 
Alliance for Germany -
Allied Control Council -
Anton Ackermann - 
Erich Apel - 
Aqua scooter -
Arms race - 
Association of Free Democrats -
Auferstanden aus Ruinen

B
Egon Bahr - 
Rudolf Bahro - 
Baltic Sea - 
Bautzen - 
Johannes R. Becher -
Jurek Becker - 
Begrüßungsgeld - 
Sabine Bergmann-Pohl -
Berlin Airlift - 
Berlin Blockade - 
Berlin-Karlshorst - 
Berlin Wall - 
Berliner Rundfunk - 
Frank Beyer - 
Udo Beyer - 
Wolf Biermann - 
Bild-Zeitung - 
Lothar Bisky - 
Blockpartei - 
Bärbel Bohley - 
Brandenburg - 
Brandenburg Gate - 
Willy Brandt - 
Bertolt Brecht - 
Werner Bruschke -
Thomas Brussig

C
Cabaret - 
Heiner Carow - 
Checkpoint Charlie - 
Chemnitz (former Karl-Marx-Stadt) - 
Christian Democratic Union (East Germany) -
CoCom - 
Cold War - 
Edmund Collein - 
Combat Groups of the Working Class - 
Comecon - 
Coming Out (1989 film) - 
Communist Party of Germany -
Conscientious objection in East Germany - 
Cottbus - 
Council of Foreign Ministers - 
Cultural Association of the DDR -
Culture of the German Democratic Republic

D
Franz Dahlem - 
Democracy Now -
Democratic Awakening -
Democratic Farmers' Party of Germany -
Democratic Women's League of Germany -
DEFA (film studio) - 
Deutsche Reichsbahn - 
Deutscher Fernsehfunk - 
Die andere Liebe (film)  -
Heike Drechsler - 
Dresden -

E

East Berlin -
East Germany -
East German Constitution - 
East German Mark - 
East German Green Party - 
East German uprising of 1953 -
East Germany national football team - 
Economic System of Socialism - 
Economy of East Germany -
Education in East Germany -
Werner Eggerath -
Hanns Eisler - 
Karin Enke - 
Erfurt - 
ESER - 
Exclusive Mandate

F
Fernsehturm - 
Fichtelberg - 
Birgit Fischer - 
Flag of East Germany - 
Forum check - 
Four Power Agreement on Berlin - 
Frankfurt (Oder) - 
Free German Trade Union Federation - 
Free German Youth

G
Gera - 
German Economic Commission -
German Forum Party -
German reunification -
German Social Union - 
Ghost station - 
Glienicke Bridge - 
Marlies Göhr - 
Good Bye Lenin! -
Otto Grotewohl -
Günter Guillaume -
Gregor Gysi

H
Nina Hagen - 
Halle, Saxony-Anhalt - 
Hallstein Doctrine - 
Wolfgang Harich - 
Robert Havemann - 
Stephan Hermlin - 
Stefan Heym - 
History of East Germany - 
Margot Honecker - 
Erich Honecker  -
Hoheneck women's prison

I
Initiative for Peace and Human Rights -
Inner German border -
Intershop -
Interflug

J
Sigmund Jähn - 
Jena - 
jokes - 
Jugendweihe - 
Junge Welt

K
Kampfgruppen der Arbeiterklasse - 
Hermann Kant - 
Karat - 
Sarah Kirsch - 
Marita Koch - 
Katrin Krabbe - 
Egon Krenz - 
Manfred Krug

L
The Legend Of Paul And Paula - 
Leipzig - 
Wolfgang Leonhard -
LGBT rights in the German Democratic Republic -
Liberal Democratic Party of Germany -
Love Without Fear (film)

M
Magdeburg - 
Lothar de Maizière - 
Kurt Masur -
Henry Maske - 
Mecklenburg - 
Mecklenburg-Western Pomerania - 
Meissen porcelain - 
Erich Mielke - 
Military of East Germany - 
Ministerrat - 
Memorial and Education Centre Andreasstrasse - 
Hans Modrow -
Monday demonstrations in GDR - 
Irmtraud Morgner - 
Heiner Müller - 
Inge Müller - 
Armin Mueller-Stahl

N
National Democratic Party of Germany -
National Front coalition - 
National Prize of East Germany - 
Neues Deutschland - 
New Forum - 
Gunda Niemann-Stirnemann - 
Nikolaikirche Leipzig

O
Oder-Neisse line -
One, Two, Three - Kristin Otto - 
Ore Mountains - 
Organization for Security and Co-operation in Europe - 
Ostalgie -
Ostmark -
Ostpolitik - 
Kristin Otto

P
Palast der Republik -
Party of Democratic Socialism (Germany) -
Peace Race -
Peaceful Revolution -  
Wilhelm Pieck - 
Ulrich Plenzdorf - 
Potsdam Agreement - 
Ulrike Poppe -
Konrad Püschel -
Puhdys

Q

R
Radio Berlin International - 
Radio Free Europe -
Heinrich Rau - 
Ronald Reagan - 
Reisekader - 
Rostock - 
Round table
Rundfunk der DDR - 
Rundfunk im amerikanischen Sektor

S
Sandmännchen - 
Sachsen - 
Sachsen-Anhalt - 
Günter Schabowski -
Alexander Schalck-Golodkowski - 
Schießbefehl - 
Schönefeld International Airport - 
Der schwarze Kanal - 
Schwerin - 
Anna Seghers - 
Werner Seelenbinder - 
Sender Freies Berlin - 
Horst Sindermann -
Socialist Unity Party of Germany - 
Vasily Sokolovsky - 
Soviet Military Administration in Germany -
Soviet occupation zone -
Sportvereinigung (SV) Dynamo -
Spartakiad - 
Traces of Stones -
Stalin Note - 
Stasi - 
Stasi Records Agency - 
States Chamber - 
Steinstücken - 
Manfred Stolpe - 
Willi Stoph - 
Renate Stecher - 
SV Dynamo

T
Ernst Thälmann - 
Thälmann pioneers - 
Thuringia - 
Ulf Timmermann -
Tourism in East Germany -
Trabant - 
Trading of East German political prisoners - 
Treaty on the Final Settlement with Respect to Germany - 
Treuhand - 
Der Tunnel

U
Walter Ulbricht -
Ulbricht Doctrine - 
Uprising of 1953 in East Germany -
Unofficial collaborator

V
VEB Robotron - 
Volkseigener Betrieb -
Volkskammer -
Volkspolizei

W
Wartburg - 
Jens Weißflog - 
Wir sind das Volk - 
Katarina Witt - 
Wittenberg - 
Christa Wolf -
Markus Wolf -

X

Y

Z
Wilhelm Zaisser - Georgy Zhukov

List of unwritten articles
Geography of East Germany -
Demographics of East Germany -
Die Alternative -
Staatsratsvorsitzender -
Ständige Vertretung der Bundesrepublik Deutschland (de)-
Selbstschussanlage (de)-
Ausbürgerung (de)- 
Church in the GDR - 
Reisefreiheit (de)

See also
 Lists of country-related topics

German Democratic Republic